Slime may refer to:

Biology 
 Slime mold, a broad term often referring to roughly six groups of Eukaryotes
 Biofilm, an aggregate of microorganisms in which cells adhere to each other and/or to a surface
 Slimy (fish), also known as the ponyfish
 Snail slime, the mucus used by gastropods for locomotion
 Subsurface Lithoautotrophic Microbial Ecosystem (SLiME), a biotope occupied by 'slime'.

Chemistry 

Gunge (UK) or Slime (US), a thick, gooey, yet runny substance used in children's TV programmes.
Flubber (material), a rubbery polymer commonly called slime.  
 Slimes, another name for tailings, a waste material left after the process of separation of ores

Computing 
 SLIME, the Superior Lisp Interaction Mode for Emacs, an Emacs mode for developing Common Lisp applications

Geography
 Slime, a village, population 270, near Omiš, Croatia

Fiction
 "Slime" (short story) (Russian: тина), a short story by Anton Chekhov
 "Slime", a novelette by Joseph Payne Brennan. Originally published in the March 1953 issue of Weird Tales
 Slimey the Worm, the pet of Oscar the Grouch on Sesame Street
 Slime (Dragon Quest), the mascot of the Dragon Quest console role-playing game franchise
 Slimer, a green ghost made of slime from the film Ghostbusters
 Slime, a hostile mob from Minecraft that splits into multiple smaller slimes when killed.

Brands
 Slime (toy), a viscous, oozing green material made primarily from guar gum and sold with a plastic trash can
 Slime (brand), a brand of tire care products

Music
 Slime (band), a German punk rock band, founded in 1979 and disbanded in 1994

Other uses
 Slime (video game), a 1982 video game for Atari 8-bit family
 Slime (series), a video game series unrelated to the video game from 1982

See also
 Green slime (disambiguation)
 Pink slime, meat trimmings separated from fat by a centrifuge 
 Blob (disambiguation)
 Oobleck (disambiguation)
 Slime ball (disambiguation)
 
 

Fluid dynamics